Jack Dunne may refer to:
 Jack Dunne (hurler)
 Jack Dunne (rugby union)
 Jack Dunne (footballer)

See also
 Jack Dunn (disambiguation)
 John Dunne (disambiguation)